The Tugendhat family was a family of Czech-Jewish textile and oil industrialists. World War II scattered them through Europe and America, and descendants have become influential politicians and academics.

Family name 
 Christopher Tugendhat, Baron Tugendhat (born 1937), a British Conservative politician, businessman
 Ernst Tugendhat (1930–2023), Czech-German philosopher
 Michael Tugendhat (born 1944), judge of the High Court of England and Wales, brother of Christopher Tugendhat
 Tom Tugendhat (born 1973), British Conservative politician, son of Michael Tugendhat

See also 
 Villa Tugendhat, house in Brno, Czech Republic, designed by Ludwig Mies van der Rohe
 Tugendhat chair, a chair designed by Mies for the Villa Tugendhat
 8343 Tugendhat, a main-belt asteroid discovered on 1986 by A. Mrkos

Jewish families
Jewish surnames
German-language surnames